RSMG may refer to:

 Russell Simmons Music Group
 16S rRNA (guanine527-N7)-methyltransferase, an enzyme